Van Saun may refer to:

Jesse Van Saun (born 1976), American soccer player
Van Saun County Park, park in Paramus, New Jersey, United States